Tomohiro Anraku (born November 4, 1996) is a Japanese professional baseball pitcher for the Tohoku Rakuten Golden Eagles of Nippon Professional Baseball (NPB). He was drafted second overall in the 2014 NPB draft out of Saibi High School in Ehime Prefecture, Japan.

During the 2013 Spring Kōshien high school tournament, Anraku threw 772 pitches over five games in nine days, including 232 in one game.

References

External links

NPB stats

Living people
1996 births
Baseball people from Ehime Prefecture
Japanese baseball players
Nippon Professional Baseball pitchers
Tohoku Rakuten Golden Eagles players